Chak Wardak (also known as Chak) is a district in the south of Wardak Province, Afghanistan. Its population was estimated at 83,376 in 2005, the last year for which figures are available. The district centre is the village of Chak Wardak.

The district is within the heartland of the Wardak tribe of Pashtuns.

History
Outside Chak Wardak there are many ancient Buddhist remains, including a fortified monastery and six stupas, one of which contained a bronze vase with a Kharoshthi inscription that held 61 Kushan coins, which is now in the British Museum's collection.

See also 
 Chaki Wardak Dam

References 

UNHCR District Profile, dated 2002-07-31, accessed 2006-08-15 (PDF).

External links 
Map of Chaki Wardak district (PDF)

Districts of Maidan Wardak Province